Arnau Ramon (died 1112) was the Count of Pallars Jussà from 1098 until his death. He was the second son of Ramon IV and co-ruled with his elder brother Pere Ramon until the latter's death in 1111. After this he was succeeded by his younger brother Bernat Ramon. There is preserved a document recording how Ramon IV exempted Arnau from owing his brother Pere potestas for the castle of Talarn:

The right of potestas ("power") was the right of a superior to assume direct control of a castle upon request.

Notes

References
Kosto, Adam J. 2001. Making Agreements in Medieval Catalonia: Power, Order, and the Written Word, 1000–1200. Cambridge: Cambridge University Press. 

1112 deaths
Counts of Pallars Jussà
Year of birth unknown